Quiero amarte (English title: Loving you is all I want) is a Mexican telenovela produced by Carlos Moreno for Televisa that aired on Canal de las Estrellas from October 21, 2013 to June 1, 2014. It is a remake of Imperio de cristal, produced by Carlos Sotomayor and writers Jaime Garcia Estrada and Orlando Merino in 1994. Production of Quiero Amarte officially started on August 20, 2013.

Karyme Lozano and Cristián de la Fuente star as the protagonists, with Diana Bracho, Flavio Medina and Salvador Zerboni star as the antagonists, with the participations of the first actors José Elías Moreno, Otto Sirgo and Olivia Bucio, with Andrés Mercado and Renata Notni star as the youth protagonists with Diego Amozurrutia as the Youth antagonist.

In the United States the telenovela aired on Univision from September 22, 2014 to May 8, 2015.

Plot
Mauro Montesinos is a widower and owner of a coffee plantation. He falls in love with Florencia Martinez, the owner of some coffee lands next to his plantation. However, the love between Mauro and Florencia is impossible because when they are about to marry, Mauro discovers that Lucrecia, an old friend of his, is pregnant with his child. Mauro and Florencia must separate despite their big love. Thirty years pass, and Florencia and Mauro´s past is brought back to life when Maximiliano Montesino, (Mauro´s son) falls in love with Amaya, Florencia´s daughter. Both must fight against many hardships in order to discovery if their love is stronger than the unfortunate past lived by their parents.

Cast

Main

Supporting

Recurring

Special participation

Awards and nominations

References

External links 

Mexican telenovelas
2013 telenovelas
Televisa telenovelas
2013 Mexican television series debuts
Spanish-language telenovelas
2014 Mexican television series endings